

The COW Biplane was a British tractor biplane built to compete in the 1912 British Military Aeroplane Competition. It was not successful.

Design and development
When the War Office held a competition to find a military aeroplane for the newly formed Royal Flying Corps, the directors of the Coventry Ordnance Works decided to enter two aircraft. The company had just taken over the business of Howard T. Wright in Battersea, and they directed Wright and W.O. Manning to design and build the aircraft.

Manning designed two slightly different aircraft. Both were unequal-span tractor biplanes, the first had two crew seated side-by-side, and was powered by a  Gnome rotary engine, the other had the two crew in tandem and was powered by a  Chenu inline engine.

Construction of the Gnome powered aircraft started at Battersea in early 1912, by the end of April 1912 the components of the aircraft were moved to Hangar No. 32 at Brooklands for completion. The aircraft flew soon afterwards piloted by Thomas Sopwith who had been hired as a test pilot. On the day after the first flight the aircraft entered an impromptu competition and race at Brooklands, taking three passengers with two of the passengers sitting outside of the cockpit on the lower wing.

Construction of the second Chenu-powered aircraft followed and it was delivered to Brooklands in July 1912. The second aircraft differed in engine, seating arrangement, smaller wingspan, and shorter fuselage. Unusual for its time, it was fitted with a four-bladed propeller made from two two-bladed propellers joined together.

The War Office allocated Trial No. 10 to the Gnome-powered aircraft and No. 11 to the Chenu-powered one, thereafter they were always identified as Biplane No. 10 and Biplane No. 11. No. 10 arrived at Larkhill Aerodrome in good time for the competition but No. 11 was moved by road and due to delays it missed the entry deadline. Although No. 11 was not disqualified it failed to compete due to engine problems, suffering repeated failures of the magneto drive followed by failure of the reduction gear housing (similar problems with a Chenu engine also grounded the Martin and Handasyde entry to the competition). No. 10 started the competition but had to be withdrawn with propeller problems.

The aircraft could not be fixed at Larkhill as Manning was abroad and Wright had left the company, so the aircraft were returned to Brooklands after the competition for further work. Manning decided to re-build No. 10 using the original fuselage and tail and retaining the engine, but it was fitted with new wings and landing gear. The modified No. 10 flew again on 13 January 1913 and was flown throughout 1913. The fate on No. 11 is unknown.

Variants
No. 10
Gnome-powered biplane for 1912 Military Aeroplane Competition with side-by-side seating, later modified with new wings and other changes.
No. 11
Chenu-powered biplane for 1912 Military Aeroplane Competition with tandem seating.

Specifications (No. 10)

References

Notes

Bibliography

External links

1910s British military aircraft
Single-engined tractor aircraft
Biplanes
Biplane
Rotary-engined aircraft
Aircraft first flown in 1912